Conasprella mazei, common name Maze's cone, is a species of predatory sea snail, a marine gastropod mollusk in the family Conidae, the cone snails, cone shells or cones.

Like all species within the genus Conasprella, these cone snails are predatory and venomous. They are capable of "stinging" humans, therefore live ones should be handled carefully or not at all.

Description 
Conasprella mazei is a very consistent species, displaying little variation throughout its range. The shell of this species is very elongate with an unusually high spire. The shell color is whitish with brown dot markings that can be almost square in shape.

The maximum recorded shell length is 59 mm.

Distribution
This is a western Atlantic species, occurring in the Caribbean Sea 
as far East as Barbados, and in the Gulf of Mexico.

Habitat 
This is a deepwater species. The minimum recorded depth is 152 m., and the maximum recorded depth is 549 m.

References

Conidae offshore de Guadeloupe : Description du matériel dragué lors de l’expédition KARUBENTHOS 2 contenant de nouvelles espèces. Xenophora Taxonomy 24: 3-31
 Puillandre N., Duda T.F., Meyer C., Olivera B.M. & Bouchet P. (2015). One, four or 100 genera? A new classification of the cone snails. Journal of Molluscan Studies. 81: 1-23

External links
 Conus mazei - Information on this species

mazei
Gastropods described in 1874